Luis Andrés Caputo (born 21 April 1965) is an Argentine economist who was Minister of Public Finances and President of the Central Bank of Argentina.

Surprisingly, in the middle of a negotiation with the International Monetary Fund and internal policies, he presented his resignation as chief of the central bank and was replaced by the Secretary of Economic Policy of the Ministry of Treasury, Guido Sandleris.

Caputo is classified as a pragmatist, with reflexes to react to market movements and will be remembered as the maker of financing during gradualism.

Early life and education
Caputo completed his primary and secondary studies at the catholic and bilingual La Salle College. He graduated with a degree in Economics from the University of Buenos Aires.

His cousin, Nicolás Caputo, is a construction industry entrepreneur close to Mauricio Macri.

Academics
He has been Professor of Economics and Finance in the postgraduate course of the Pontifical Catholic University of Argentina.

Finances
Caputo served as Chief of Trading for Latin America at JP Morgan between 1994 and 1998, and he held the same position for Eastern Europe and Latin America at Deutsche Bank between 1998 and 2003.

From that year until 2008 he was chairman of the Argentine branch of Deutsche Bank.

Private sector
He has also been Director of an electric distribution company and an Administrator of common funds of investment created by him.

Secretary and Minister of Finances 
In December 2015 Caputo assumed the position of Secretary of Finances of the Macri's administration.

During his tenure he played a key role together with Alfonso Prat Gay in the negotiation with the hedge funds, where the country agreed to pay 9.352 million US dollars and Argentina returned to international capital markets and guaranteed external financing in a difficult context as a result of the default inherited from Cristina Fernández de Kirchner.

On 26 December 2016, after the dismissal of Alfonso Prat-Gay by President Macri, the Ministry of Treasury and Public Finance was split in two, with Caputo being appointed Minister of Finance in January 2017.

He continued to take on the task of ensuring the arrival of the necessary funds to face the fiscal deficit. His deep knowledge of international finance and direct contact with interlocutors on Wall Street are highlighted.

President of Central Bank
On June 14, Caputo became President of the BCRA. His main challenge was to contain inflation, results that Sturzenegger's administration did not achieve in 2018.
 
Caputo was in the midst of a context of mistrust in the economic program. He increased the interest rate from 20% and Argentine peso was devalued 40% in three months during its administration.

He disarmed the Letters of the Central Bank, and is considered one of the victories.

Meanwhile, the BCRA's reserves in June were $45 million and, upon announcing its resignation, it reached $49 million (considering here the IMF's money inflow).

He resigned on September 25, 2018 at the request of the International Monetary Fund and was replaced by Guido Sandleris.

Argentine stocks and bonds fell after his departure from the Central Bank.

Controversies

On 2017, a government branch of the Fiscal Ministry, opened a judicial case accusing Luis Caputo of embezzling money from a Social Security fund by paying fees of at least 540,000 AR$ to a Company he had owned and directed until 2015 in lieu of services that were unnecessary.

On 5 November 2017, the Paradise Papers, a set of confidential electronic documents relating to offshore investment, revealed that Caputo have managed at least two offshore wealth funds. Neither the Cayman Islands–based Alto Global Fund nor its Miami-based parent company, Noctua Partners LLC, were listed in Caputo's financial disclosure statement, a statement that all public officials and candidates for office are required to make. He told Argentine members of the ICIJ team that "it was an investment fund for friends and family."

The funds, opened in 2009 and with over $100 million under management, remained under Caputo's management until December 2015, when Macri named him Finance Secretary, a post upgraded to Finance Minister in January 2017.

Other activities
 Central American Bank for Economic Integration (CABEI), Ex-Officio Member of the Board of Governors
 Multilateral Investment Guarantee Agency (MIGA), World Bank Group, Ex-Officio Member of the Board of Governors

References

External links 
 Nicolás Dujovne: conductor de TN, columnista de La Nación y asesor de Cambiemos en la campaña

1965 births
Living people
Presidents of the Central Bank of Argentina
University of Buenos Aires alumni
20th-century Argentine economists
21st-century Argentine economists
Argentine Ministers of Finance
People named in the Paradise Papers